= Renzenberger, Inc. =

US transportation company

Renzenberger, Inc. (United States, est. 1983), is a company that provides transportation services for the rail industry. It has over 1,800 vehicles operating in around 34 states. Renzenberger drivers are required to transport railroad workers to and from the trains (i.e. BNSF Railway freight trains). The railroad workers are the train's engineer, and conductor, that are called a "crew," because both are needed to drive a train. When a crew goes off-duty, the train is stopped at the nearest road crossing, and a crew is brought to relieve them, then the off-duty crew is taken to an assigned hotel, or railway yard.

On November 19, 2013, Renzenberger announced a merger with Hallcon. Hallcon appears to be the administrative head, as the renzenberger.com website redirects there.
